She Stoops to Conquer is a 2015 Canadian short film directed by Zachary Russell. It stars Kayla Lorette and Julian Richings, and had its world premiere at the 2015 Toronto International Film Festival.

The film follows "a struggling talent-show performer who wanders into a nightclub disguised in a mask, and is inexplicably attracted to the real-life doppelgänger of her masked character." Lorette wore a prosthetic mask of Richings' face for the film.

The film has played numerous festivals worldwide, including the Vancouver International Film Festival, the Raindance Film Festival, and the New Orleans Film Festival.

The film has garnered critical praise and won the Canadian Screen Award for Best Live Action Short Drama at the 4th Canadian Screen Awards.

References

External links

2015 films
Canadian drama short films
2015 short films
Best Live Action Short Drama Genie and Canadian Screen Award winners
2010s English-language films
2010s Canadian films